OET may refer to:
Occupational English Test, a test for health professionals wishing to work or study in Australia.
Old English Text, a font imitating late medieval English textura letterforms.